Nation Time is a live album by saxophonist and composer Joe McPhee recorded in late 1970 and originally released on the CjR label, then reissued by Atavistic in 2000.

Reception

The Allmusic review by Lang Thompson stated "the end result is inventive and captivating". On All About Jazz, Robert Spencer noted "one of the most exciting things about this album is the sense of space. Although all three of these tracks are quite propulsive, McPhee and his men are imaginative enough to continue to refresh them with rhythmic and other variations". PopMatters writer Imre Szeman said "Nation Time is as a good a place as any to start a sustained relationship with this genius of modern jazz. It’s the kind of album that you want to tell everyone about and that you want to force everyone to listen to. Brilliant stuff-an absolutely, positively recommended addition to your collection".

Track listing 
All compositions by Joe McPhee except as indicated
 "Nation Time" - 18:31
 "Shakey Jake" - 13:36
 "Scorpio's Dance" (Joe McPhee, Mike Kull, Tyrone Crabb, Bruce Thompson, Ernest Bostic) - 8:42

Personnel 
Joe McPhee - tenor saxophone, trumpet
Otis Greene - alto saxophone (track 2)
Mike Kull - piano, electric piano
Herbie Lehman - organ (track 2)
Dave Jones - guitar (track 2)
Tyrone Crabb - bass, electric bass, trumpet
Bruce Thompson, Ernest Bostic - percussion

References 

Joe McPhee live albums
1971 live albums
Atavistic Records live albums